Jemez or Jémez may refer to 
Jemez Pueblo, New Mexico, a census-designated place in the United States
Jemez Springs, New Mexico, a village 
Jemez Mountains 
Jemez Mountains salamander (Plethodon neomexicanus)
Jemez Mountains Electric Cooperative, Inc. 
Jemez Falls, a waterfall in the Jemez Mountains 
Jemez River in the area of the Jemez Mountains 
Jemez National Forest 
Jemez Canyon Dam 
Jemez Lineament, a series of faults
Jemez Historic Site, a state-operated historic site 
Jemez Valley Public Schools 
Jemez National Recreation Area 
Jemez language
Paco Jémez (born 1970), Spanish football defender

Language and nationality disambiguation pages